CurrencyFair is an online peer-to-peer currency exchange marketplace. CurrencyFair is headquartered in Ireland and also has employees in the UK, Australia, Greece, Hong Kong, Poland and Singapore.

The company has established working sectors in Newcastle, NSW, Australia, Singapore and Hong Kong. CurrencyFair provides international money transfers in 20 global currencies.

CurrencyFair is a marketplace where money is never exchanged across borders; rather, it stays in the country of origin, thereby avoiding bank conversion fees. Customers have one currency but need funds in another. They are "matched" with someone with a corresponding need - someone who has that currency but needs the other.

With CurrencyFair, customers can match with someone straightaway using an Auto-Transaction or set a desired rate in a currency and wait to partially or fully match with someone in the Exchange Queue who is going in the opposite currency direction.

In an interview with Irish Tech News, co-founder Brett Meyers said "CurrencyFair is a peer to peer currency transfer service that empowers people to send money from their domestic bank account to their own, or a third party’s, foreign bank account up to 90% cheaper than they can using a bank or broker”.

In an August 2018 interview with the Independent.ie, CEO Paul Byrne said "Asia is where we think most growth will come from over time and we want to be part of that story".

Currently rated 1.9 out of 5 stars in the category of travel money cards and currency exchanges on the Australian Product Review website . Many people have voiced their complaints about payments being held and not returned unless thorough justification is given.

History
CurrencyFair was established in April 2009 by co-founders Brett Meyers, Jonathan Potter, Sean Barrett and David Christian. 

While the company's website went live in May 2010, it was officially "launched" in December 2013 by then Irish Taoiseach Enda Kenny. At the time, 30 new jobs were announced.

In early 2014 CurrencyFair became the first platform in the world to break the $1 billion (€916 million) barrier in money-matching transfers and in April 2017 CurrencyFair revamped their platform to enable SMEs to use the service.

CurrencyFair announced at the Web Summit in Lisbon in 2016 that it had raised €8 million in funding. A mobile app was launched in September 2015.

As of August 2017, the company announced it had traded over €5 billion. By July 2018, this had reputedly increased to over €7 billion.

In August 2018, the company announced a €20 million investment plan into the Asian market and the acquisition of Hong Kong-based Convoy Payments. Also in August 2018, CEO Paul Byrne spoke on the Newstalk Business Breakfast show about their recent €20m funding and acquisition.

In October 2019, CurrencyFair announced its sponsorship of the 2019 Asian Gaelic Games, with a launch event in Croke Park.

In December 2019, the company completed a partnership agreement with Chinese online trade network Buy-World to launch its marketplace payment product.

Recognition
In November 2012, CurrencyFair was one of four companies to be named Best of Show at the inaugural FinovateAsia conference in Singapore.

In 2013, CurrencyFair won the IIA Dot IE Net Visionary Awards for Most Insightful and Intriguing Internet Innovation.

In October 2017, CurrencyFair was listed in the Top 20 Fintech Companies in Ireland by Irish Tech News.

In November 2017, CurrencyFair was listed in a list of the "Fintech Startups in Europe to watch in 2018".

In January 2018, CurrencyFair was listed in the Silicon Republic's list of the Top 100 Startups to watch in 2018

In May 2018, of the 28 international money transfer providers licensed to operate in Australia, CurrencyFair was one of the three providers that made the Mozo.com.au 2018 Mozo Experts Choice Awards winners list.

In November 2018, CurrencyFair COO/CFO Ruth Fletcher won the "CFO of the Year" award at the Women in Finance Awards 2018, and was also recognised at the 2018 "Women in Tech Awards".

Media
In January 2017, Brett Meyers appeared on BBC News to discuss peer-to-peer exchange and Brexit.

In June 2018, CurrencyFair was mentioned in the Money Section of a Sunday Times Article on how Apps can help you track your spending and save money.

In June 2019, CurrencyFair published their Brexit Breakup Survey and appeared in an article on the Irish Times website and the Yahoo Finance website. Later in 2019, CurrencyFair CEO Paul Byrne appeared on CNBC's "Squawk Box Asia".

See also
 MoneyGram
 Ria Financial Services
 Transfast
 Western Union
 TransferWise
 TransferMate

References

Financial services companies established in 2009
Online remittance providers
Electronic funds transfer
Foreign exchange companies